Bruno Gagliasso Marques (born 13 April 1982) is a Brazilian actor.

Career 
He began his career as a child, appearing in Rede Globo soap operas. In 1999, he participated in the episode "Papai é Gay!" on the program Você Decide. The following year, 2000, he made a cameo on the show Malhação, whose protagonists were played by Ludmila Dayer and Fábio Azevedo. Then he moved to the SBT, where he landed his first substantial role on the telenovela Chiquititas.

In 2001 he signed with Globo, the TV network which he remains under contract to as of the present, to join the cast of the telenovela As Filhas da Mãe, as Artur, the son of Rosalva Regina Casé.

In 2007 he played his first telenovela villain, the seductive bastard Ivan on Paraíso Tropical. In contrast to 2008, he played the romantic hero Eduardo of Ciranda de Pedra. Emendo in 2009, he reappeared in the video as the schizophrenic Tarso in India – A Love Story.

In 2010 he played the role of Italian bigamist Berillo Rondelli Passione in the telenovela. In 2011, he played the wicked Colonel Timóteo Cabral, the main antagonist of the telenovela Cordel Encantado.

In 2013, he starred in the movie Mato sem Cachorro alongside Leandra Leal and in the telenovela Joia Rara along with Bianca Bin.

In 2014, the actor turned down offers to act in two upcoming soap operas, Búu and Falso Brilhante; instead he chose to make the TV series Dupla Identidade, on which he played the main role as a serial killer.

Filmography

Stage 
 Um Certo Van Gogh
 Onde Está Você Agora?

References

External links 

1982 births
Living people
20th-century Brazilian male actors
21st-century Brazilian male actors
Male actors from Rio de Janeiro (city)
Brazilian people of Italian descent
Brazilian male television actors
Brazilian male film actors
Brazilian male stage actors